Bikuškis Manor is a former residential manor near Sudeikiai, Utena district.

References

Manor houses in Lithuania
Classicism architecture in Lithuania